Balgale Parish is an administrative unit of Talsi Municipality, Latvia.

Towns, villages and settlements of Balgale parish 
  – parish administrative center

Notable people 
 Uģis Brūvelis

See also 
 Dursupe Manor

References 

Parishes of Latvia
Talsi Municipality